Sir John Strode (c. 1561 – bef. 15 July 1642), of the Middle Temple, London and Chantmarle, Cattistock, Dorset, was an English MP for Bridport in 1621 and 1625.

Early life
Born circa 1561, Strode was the third son of John Strode of Parnham, Dorset and his first wife, Katherine, daughter of Gregory Cromwell, 1st Baron Cromwell and Elizabeth Seymour.

Strode was educated at New Inn, then Middle Temple, 1583. He was called to the bar in 1590.

Career
Strode, a lawyer by profession, who gained a reputation as "an honest, trusty, learned, religious gentleman", served as a Justice of the Peace for Dorset by 1593–1642, commissioner sewers 1617, martial law 1626, knighthood compositions 1631, piracy 1631.

He was Autumn reader, Middle Temple in 1611, bencher from 1611 to 1642, treasurer from 1619 to 1620; recorder, Bridport, Dorset from 1618 to 1640.
He was knighted at Theobalds 1 December 1623.

He died at the Middle Temple before 15 July in 1642. His widow was murdered defending Parnham House, near Beaminster in Dorset, in 1645 by a soldier under the command of Sir Thomas Fairfax during the Civil War.

Marriages and issue
Strode married twice. He married firstly, Anne (d. 8 Aug. 1621), daughter of William Chaldecote of Quarleston, Dorset, and widow of Robert Bingham (d. 1587) of Bingham's Melcombe, Dorset, by whom he had no children.

He married secondly, 12 January 1622, Ann (d. 1645), daughter of Sir John Wyndham of Orchard Wyndham, Somerset, by whom he had four sons and two daughters:
 Sir John Strode (1624–1679)
 Sir George Strode died c.1707
 Hugh Strode
 Thomas Strode

Notes

References

External links

 Ferris, John P. (2010). "Strode, John (c.1561-1642), of the Middle Temple, London and Chantmarle, Cattistock, Dorset". In Thrush, Andrew; Ferris, John P. (eds.). The History of Parliament: the House of Commons 1604–1629. at historyofparliamentonline.org

1560s births
1642 deaths
Members of the Middle Temple
English MPs 1621–1622
Politicians from Dorset
English MPs 1625